The following lists events that happened during 1851 in New Zealand.

Population
The estimated population of New Zealand at the end of 1851 is 64,350 Māori and 26,707 non-Māori.

Incumbents

Regal and viceregal
Head of State – Queen Victoria
Governor – Sir George Grey

Government and law
Chief Justice — William Martin
Lieutenant Governor, New Munster — Edward John Eyre
Lieutenant Governor, New Ulster — George Dean Pitt until 8 January. Robert Henry Wynyard from 26 April.

Main centre leaders
Mayor of Auckland — Archibald Clark

Events
Governor Grey issues a charter creating the Borough of Auckland. Archibald Clark becomes Mayor. (see also 1852)
11 January: The Otago Witness begins publication. It publishes fortnightly until August, and then weekly until its demise in 1932.
11 January: The Lyttelton Times begins publication. It will change its name to the Christchurch Times in 1929, and continue until 1935.
1 November: First national census held in New Zealand, counting European dwellings and population only.
24 December: The Governor Wynyard, the first steamer built in New Zealand, is launched at Freemans Bay, Auckland.

Undated
Wynyard Pier is the first wharf built on the Auckland waterfront.

Births
 31 March: Francis Bell, politician and 20th Prime Minister of New Zealand.
 11 September: Henry Samuel Fitzherbert, lawyer and politician.

Deaths
 8 January: George Dean Pitt, Lieutenant Governor of New Ulster
 29 January: Wiremu Piti Pomare, tribal leader
 28 October: Wiremu Hikairo, tribal leader

See also
List of years in New Zealand
Timeline of New Zealand history
History of New Zealand
Military history of New Zealand
Timeline of the New Zealand environment
Timeline of New Zealand's links with Antarctica

References